Merci is a 1990 album recorded by French singer Florent Pagny. It was his first studio album and was released on May 1, 1990. The album was a success in France, where it remained in the top 50 for 44 weeks, including two weeks at #10. It was entirely written by the singer himself and contains several songs deemed controversial at the time, such as "Presse qui roule", which is critical of press. The album provided four singles which were moderately successful in France: "J'te jure" (#16), "Ça fait des nuits" (#17), "Presse qui roule" (#24) and "Prends ton temps" (#42).

Track listing
 "Merci" (Pagny) — 4:16
 "Ça fait des nuits" (Pagny) — 3:57
 "J'te jure" (D'Angelo, Pagny, Kamil Rustam) — 4:26
 "On est juste de passage" (D'Angelo, Pagny, Kamil Rustam) — 4:40
 "Questions sans réponse" (D'Angelo, Pagny, Kamil Rustam) — 3:59
 "Reste chez toi" (D'Angelo, Pagny, Kamil Rustam) — 3:39
 "Pour la vie" (Pagny) — 4:01
 "Prends ton temps" (Langolff, Pagny) — 3:50
 "Emergency" (Nevil, Pagny, Walsh, Warren) — 3:56
 "Presse qui roule" (Pagny) — 4:43
 "Heureux de vivre" (Meunier, Pagny) — 3:40

Source : Allmusic.

Charts

Certifications and sales

Releases

References

1990 debut albums
Florent Pagny albums